The Scrapbook is the fourth studio album by Australian singer-songwriter Angus Gill. It was released on 24 September 2021 both digitally and on CD and vinyl. It reached number one on the ARIA Australian Country Albums Chart, number one on the AIR 100% Independent Albums Chart and number 19 on the ARIA Top 50 Album Charts. The album was nominated for four Golden Guitar Awards at the 50th Country Music Awards of Australia.

Critical reception
Rhythms declared The Scrapbook "one of the most authentic bluegrass albums ever recorded in Australia". US publication Mother Church Pew said, "With The Scrapbook, Gill's plethora of talents are in the spotlight; he amply proves he's not only a prodigious creator, but a gifted storyteller that puts his heart on the line in every turn of phrase."

Track listing

Personnel
Angus Gill – vocals, acoustic guitar, dobro and background vocals
Tim Crouch – fiddle, mandolin, banjo, acoustic guitar and double bass
Randy Kohrs – dobro and background vocals
Clay Hess – acoustic guitar and banjo
Tony Wray – acoustic guitar and banjo
Thomm Jutz – background vocals on "Always on the Run" and "Still Missing"
Gary Burr – background vocals on "Put 'er There"
Georgia Middleman – background vocals on "Put 'er There"

Production
Angus Gill – producer, engineer
Tim Crouch – producer, engineer
Jeff McCormack – mastering
Judy Nadin – album artwork

Charts

References

2021 albums
Angus Gill albums